Anand Rajaraman is a Web and technology entrepreneur.  He is the co-founder of Cambrian Ventures and Kosmix. Rajaraman also co-founded former Junglee Corp. and played a significant role at Amazon.com in the late 1990s.

Personal life and education
Rajaraman was born in Chennai, India. He has an MS and a PhD (2001) in Computer Science from Stanford University, under Jeffrey Ullman, and a Bachelor of Technology in Computer Science from IIT Madras (Class of 1993).

Career

Together with four other engineers, Rajaraman founded Junglee Corp. in 1996. Junglee Corp. pioneered Internet comparison shopping. Junglee Corp. was acquired by Amazon.com Inc. in August 1998 for 1.6 million shares of stock valued at $250 million.  
Rajaraman went on to become Director of Technology at Amazon.com, where he was responsible for technology strategy. He helped launch the transformation of Amazon.com from a retailer into a retail platform, enabling third-party retailers to sell on Amazon.com's website. Third-party transactions now account for almost 25% of all US transactions, and represent Amazon's fastest-growing and most profitable business segment.
Rajaraman also was an inventor of the concept underlying Amazon.com’s Mechanical Turk.

Rajaraman and his business partner, Venky Harinarayan, co-founded Cambrian Ventures, an early stage VC fund, in 2000. Cambrian went on to back several companies later acquired by Google.  Cambrian has funded companies like Mobissimo, Aster Data Systems and TheFind.com.  In April 2011, Kosmix was acquired by Walmart.

In addition to acting as a consulting assistant professor in the Computer Science Department at Stanford University, Rajaraman is a special partner to NeoTribe Ventures and publishes a blog called Datawocky, on which he discusses data mining techniques in search, social media, and advertising.

References

External links 
 Kosmix
 Amazon
 TheFind
 Mobissimo
 Asterdata
 Cambrian Ventures
 Datawocky
  Forbes - Technically Chaotic

American computer businesspeople
American chief executives
Businesspeople in online retailing
Living people
Stanford University alumni
People from the San Francisco Bay Area
IIT Madras alumni
Year of birth missing (living people)